Eucalyptus horistes is a species of mallee or small tree that is endemic to Western Australia. It has smooth greyish bark, often with rough, firm fibrous bark on the base or all of the trunk, lance-shaped to elliptic adult leaves, flower buds in groups of between seven and thirteen, creamy white flowers and short cylindrical to shortened spherical fruit.

Description
It has smooth greyish bark, often with rough, firm fibrous bark on the base or all of the trunk. Flowering occurs from November to December or January and the flowers are creamy white.

Taxonomy and naming
Eucalyptus horistes was first formally described in 1988 by Lawrie Johnson and Ken Hill from a specimen collected near Binnu and the description was published in Flora of Australia. The specific epithet (horistes) is an ancient Greek word meaning "one who marks boundaries", referring the distribution of this species at the northern limit of the South-west Botanical Province.

Distribution and habitat
This eucalypt grows in mallee shrubland in sandy-loam soils over laterite on sand plains, sand dunes and road verges from areas in the Mid West, extending through the Wheatbelt and into the Great Southern and Goldfields-Esperance regions of Western Australia.

Conservation status
Eucalyptus horistes is classified as "not threatened" by the Western Australian Government Department of Parks and Wildlife.

See also
List of Eucalyptus species

References

horistes
Eucalypts of Western Australia
Myrtales of Australia
Plants described in 1988
Taxa named by Lawrence Alexander Sidney Johnson
Taxa named by Ken Hill (botanist)